Jackson Farmer (born May 3, 1995) is a Canadian soccer player who plays as a defender. He is a full international for Canada.

Club career

Vancouver Whitecaps
Farmer began his career began his career with Edmonton Xtreme FC where he played from 2004 to 2009.  He then spent time with Edmonton Juventus where he played from 2009 to 2010 before returning to Xtreme FC where he played from 2010 to 2011 before eventually joining the Whitecaps Residency program.

On March 7, 2014, it was announced that Farmer was loaned to the Charleston Battery of the USL Pro, the third tier of the United States soccer league system, as part of the affiliation between the two clubs. Farmer made his professional club debut on March 22, 2014 against Orlando City SC as a late substitute for Taylor Mueller.

Farmer was signed to Vancouver's USL side, Whitecaps FC 2, on February 17, 2015. In December 2016, Whitecaps FC 2 announced that Farmer would not return to the club for the 2017 season.

Farmer would sign with Calgary Foothills for the 2018 PDL season.

He spent the 2019–20 year studying and playing college soccer at University of British Columbia.

In the 2021 CPL-U Sports Draft, he was selected sixteenth overall by FC Edmonton.

International career
On August 27, 2013, Farmer received his first international call up to the Canadian national team by new manager Benito Floro for two friendlies against Mauritania on September 8 and 10.  He made his debut in the first friendly, coming on as an 86th minute sub for Doneil Henry.  The match ended in a goalless draw. After his debut with the senior side, Farmer was included on the U20 roster that went to 2014 Milk Cup.

International career statistics

References

External links
 
 
 Whitecaps FC Residency bio

1995 births
Living people
Canadian soccer players
Canadian expatriate soccer players
Vancouver Whitecaps FC U-23 players
Charleston Battery players
Whitecaps FC 2 players
Association football defenders
Soccer players from Edmonton
Expatriate soccer players in the United States
USL Championship players
USL League Two players
Canada men's youth international soccer players
Canada men's under-23 international soccer players
Canada men's international soccer players
2015 CONCACAF U-20 Championship players
Footballers at the 2015 Pan American Games
UBC Thunderbirds soccer players
Pan American Games competitors for Canada
FC Edmonton draft picks